Gerritsz Bay (‘Zaliv Gerritsz’ \'za-liv 'ge-rits\) is the 4 km wide bay indenting for 2.15 km the north coast of Anvers Island in the Palmer Archipelago, Antarctica.  It is entered east of Oberbauer Point and west of the northwest extremity of the small peninsula forming Cape Grönland.

The point is so named in order to preserve the historical memory of the area.  Having navigated the Strait of Magellan in 1599, the Dutch mariner Dirck Gerritsz Pomp (1544-1608) was blown to the south and reportedly sighted an extensive, ice-covered mountainous land.  Although Gerritsz was unlikely to have reached 60° south latitude, some later publications used the name Gerritsz Archipelago for the Palmer Archipelago or Gerritsz Islands for the South Shetlands.

Location
British mapping in 1980.

Maps
 British Antarctic Territory.  Scale 1:200000 topographic map.  DOS 610 Series, Sheet W 64 62.  Directorate of Overseas Surveys, UK, 1980.
 Antarctic Digital Database (ADD). Scale 1:250000 topographic map of Antarctica. Scientific Committee on Antarctic Research (SCAR). Since 1993, regularly upgraded and updated.

References
 Bulgarian Antarctic Gazetteer. Antarctic Place-names Commission. (details in Bulgarian, basic data in English)
 Gerritsz Bay. SCAR Composite Antarctic Gazetteer.

External links
 Gerritsz Bay. Copernix satellite image

Bays of the Palmer Archipelago
Bulgaria and the Antarctic